The 1901 Northwestern Purple football team was an American football team that represented Northwestern University during the 1901 Western Conference football season. In its third season under head coach Charles M. Hollister, the team compiled an 8–2–1 record, finished in fifth place in the Western Conference, and outscored opponents by a total of 161 to 77. The team's sole losses were to undefeated Michigan and one-loss Minnesota.

Guard Cyrus E. Dietz was the team captain. His brother, G. O. Dietz, played at the fullback position and was selected as a first-team player on the 1901 All-Western college football teams of the Chicago Daily News and Walter Camp.

Schedule

References

Northwestern
Northwestern Wildcats football seasons
Northwestern Purple football